Comet Mountain, 3113 m (10213 feet), is a mountain peak in the Pioneer Mountains of the state of Montana, United States, located in Beaverhead County 42 km northwest of Dillon.

See also
Comet (disambiguation)

References

Geography of Beaverhead County, Montana
Rocky Mountains
Mountains of Montana